Luiz Eduardo Teodora da Silva (born 10 August 1999), commonly known as Dudu, is a Brazilian footballer who plays as a midfielder for Portuguese club Nacional.

Club career
On 1 February 2021, he signed a four-and-a-half year contract with Nacional in Portugal.

Career statistics

Club

Notes

References

External links
Dudu at ZeroZero

1999 births
Sportspeople from Campinas
Living people
Brazilian footballers
Association football midfielders
Fluminense FC players
Associação Atlética Ponte Preta players
A.C. Marinhense players
C.D. Nacional players
Campeonato Brasileiro Série A players
Campeonato de Portugal (league) players
Primeira Liga players
Liga Portugal 2 players
Brazilian expatriate footballers
Expatriate footballers in Portugal
Brazilian expatriate sportspeople in Portugal